Rivière-du-Loup is a former provincial electoral district in the Bas-Saint-Laurent region of Quebec, Canada, which elected members to the National Assembly of Quebec.

It was created for the 1931 election from a portion of the electoral district of Témiscouata.  It disappeared in the 1939 election and its successor electoral district was Kamouraska–Rivière-du-Loup; however, it was re-created for the 1944 election.

Its final general election was in 2008; there was a by-election in 2009.  It disappeared in the 2012 election and the successor electoral district was Rivière-du-Loup–Témiscouata.

Members of the Legislative Assembly / National Assembly
Léon Casgrain, Liberal (1931–1939)
 did not exist (1939–1944), see Kamouraska–Rivière-du-Loup
Léon Casgrain, Liberal (1944–1948)
Roméo Gagné, Union Nationale (1948–1956)
Alphonse Couturier, Liberal (1956–1966)
Gérard Lebel, Union Nationale (1966–1970)
Paul Lafrance, Liberal (1970–1976)
Jules Boucher, Parti Québécois (1976–1985)
Albert Côté, Liberal (1985–1994)
Mario Dumont, Action démocratique (1994-2009)
Jean D'Amour, Liberal (2009, 2009–2012), Independent (2009)

Linguistic demographics
Francophone: 99.5%
Anglophone: 0.4%
Allophone: 0.2%

Election results

|-

|Christian Socialist
|Evelyne Sévigny
|align="right"|136
|align="right"|0.62 
|align="right"|–
|}

|-

|Liberal
|Emilien Michaud 
|align="right"|9,242
|align="right"|39.72
|align="right"|+8.98
|-

|}

|-

|Liberal
|Paul Lafrance 
|align="right"|7,511
|align="right"|30.74
|align="right"|-19.67
|-

|-

|Ralliement créditiste
|Gérard Roy 
|align="right"|2,281
|align="right"|9.33
|align="right"|-12.78
|}

|-

|Parti créditiste
|Gérard Roy 
|align="right"|4,748
|align="right"|22.11
|align="right"|+9.77
|-

|-

|}

|-

|-

|Ralliement créditiste
|Robert Bergeron
|align="right"|2,558
|align="right"|12.34
|align="right"|–
|-

|}

|-

|Liberal
|Alphonse Courturier
|align="right"|8,880
|align="right"|47.82
|align="right"|-3.40
|}

|-

|}

|-

|}

|-

|-

|Independent U.N.
|Pierre-Hervé Marquis 
|align="right"|139
|align="right"|0.83
|align="right"|–
|}

|-

|Liberal
|Alphonse Courturier
|align="right"|8,236
|align="right"|48.48
|align="right"|+7.23
|-

|Independent U.N.
|Jean-Baptiste Lavoie
|align="right"|62
|align="right"|0.36
|align="right"|–
|}

|-

|Liberal
|Léon Casgrain
|align="right"|6,809
|align="right"|41.25
|align="right"|-9.12
|-

|Union des électeurs
|Marc Riou 
|align="right"|305
|align="right"|1.85
|align="right"|–
|}

|-

|}

References

External links
Information
 Elections Quebec

Election results
 Election results (National Assembly)
 Election results (QuébecPolitique)

Maps
 2001 map (Flash)
2001–2011 changes (Flash)
1992–2001 changes (Flash)
 Electoral map of Bas-Saint-Laurent region (as of 2001)
 Quebec electoral map, 2001

Former provincial electoral districts of Quebec
Rivière-du-Loup